Studena planina (Serbian Cyrillic: Студена планина) is a mountain in central Serbia, near the city of Kraljevo. Its highest peak Kavgalija has an elevation of 1,355 meters above sea level. It stretches from west to east from the Ibar river valley towards the mountain of Goč, forming a continuous ridge with Ravna planina.

References

Mountains of Serbia